Floyd Ama Nino Ayité (born 15 December 1988) is a professional footballer who plays as a midfielder for French club Valenciennes and the Togo national team. He mainly plays a winger. He is Jonathan Ayité's younger brother.

Club career
Ayité was born in Bordeaux, and started his career as a footballer for home town Bordeaux. Making his debut for the club in 2008. Loan spells at Angers and Nancy followed.

In 2011, Ayité signed for Stade de Reims, where he made 73 league appearances scoring 10 goals. He joined SC Bastia in 2014 where he scored five goals in 28 league games in his first season at the club.

On 1 July 2016, Ayité signed for English Championship club Fulham for an undisclosed fee, signing a three- year contract, with a club option of a further twelve months. He scored his first goals for Fulham when he scored twice in a 4–4 draw with Wolverhampton Wanderers on 10 December 2016.

On 2 September 2019, he signed a two-year contract with Gençlerbirliği.

On 4 August 2021, he returned to France and signed a two-year contract with Valenciennes.

International career
Despite being born in France, Ayité decide to follow in the footsteps of his older brother Jonathan Ayité and represent Togo, making his debut in 2008. On 14 November 2009, he scored his first goal for Togo, against Gabon.

In 2013 he played 3 matches at 2013 Africa Cup of Nations where his team reached the quarterfinals

Career statistics

Club

International
Scores and results list Togo's goal tally first, score column indicates score after each Ayité goal.

Honours
Fulham
EFL Championship play-offs: 2018

References

External links
Floyd Ayité at francefootball.fr 

1988 births
Living people
Footballers from Bordeaux
Association football wingers
Citizens of Togo through descent
Togolese footballers
French footballers
Togo international footballers
Ligue 1 players
English Football League players
Premier League players
FC Girondins de Bordeaux players
Ligue 2 players
Süper Lig players
Angers SCO players
AS Nancy Lorraine players
Stade de Reims players
SC Bastia players
Fulham F.C. players
Gençlerbirliği S.K. footballers
Valenciennes FC players
2010 Africa Cup of Nations players
2013 Africa Cup of Nations players
2017 Africa Cup of Nations players
French sportspeople of Togolese descent
Togolese expatriate footballers
Expatriate footballers in England
Togolese expatriate sportspeople in England
Expatriate footballers in Turkey
Togolese expatriate sportspeople in Turkey
French expatriate footballers
French expatriate sportspeople in England
French expatriate sportspeople in Turkey